The Norman River is a river in the Gulf Country, Queensland, Australia. The river originates in the Gregory Range 200 km southeast of Croydon and flows 420 km northwest to the Gulf of Carpentaria. It is joined by three major tributaries, the Carron, Clara and Yappar Rivers. The river flows through Normanton before entering the Gulf of Carpentaria through the major fishing port of Karumba.  The mouth of the river lies in the Gulf Plains Important Bird Area.

The record flood of the river occurred in 1974, cresting at 8.8 metres in Normanton and causing the inundation of the town. The river's catchment area covers 50,445 km2.

There are two water storage facilities along the river, Belmore Creek Dam and Glenore Weir, totaling 4,350 ML in capacity.

See also

List of rivers of Australia

References

External links

Flood Warning System for the Norman River. Australian Bureau of Meteorology.

Rivers of Queensland
North West Queensland